Kadipur is a constituency of the Uttar Pradesh Legislative Assembly covering the city of Kadipur in the Sultanpur district of Uttar Pradesh, India.

Kadipur is one of five assembly constituencies in the Sultanpur Lok Sabha constituency. Since 2008, this assembly constituency is numbered 191 amongst 403 constituencies.

Election results

2022

2017
Bharatiya Janta Party candidate Rajesh Gautam won in  2017 Uttar Pradesh Legislative Elections defeating Bahujan Samaj Party candidate Bhageluram by a margin of 26,604 votes.

References

External links
 

Assembly constituencies of Uttar Pradesh
Sultanpur district